Processional: A Jazz Symphony of American Life (1925) is a four-act modernist comedy by the American playwright John Howard Lawson. It was first produced by the Theatre Guild at the Garrick Theatre in New York, opening on January 12, 1925 in a two-month run. Philip Moeller directed while Mordecai Gorelik designed the sets and costumes. Lee Strasberg played the minor role of First Soldier in the production; Sanford Meisner, too, played a minor part. It was revived by the Federal Theatre Project in 1937, at Maxine Elliott's Theatre.

References 
 Lawson, John Howard. 1925. Processional: A Jazz Symphony of American Life in Four Acts. New York: Thomas Seltzer.

External links 
 
 

1925 plays
Broadway plays
Plays by John Howard Lawson
Modernist theatre